Champa Aur Chambeli (Sultana Kunji Wali on Geo Entertainment) is a 2017 Pakistani drama serial directed by Faisal Omer Turk, produced by Turk Films and written by Mustafa Hashmi.The drama was first aired 21 April on Geo Kahani, where it  aired thrice a  week Friday to Sunday at 8:00 P.M.The serial also aired on Geo Entertainment under title Sultana Kunji Wali on Monday to Friday 11:00 P.M. The story revolves around the life of two young women, Champa and Chambeli and their mother Sultana.

Cast
Fazila Qazi as Sultana
Fatima Effendi as Champa
Kiran Tabeir as Chambeli
Imran Aslam
Parveen Akbar
Rashid Farooqui
Hina Rizvi
Mariya Khan

References

2017 in Pakistani television
Pakistani television series